Cope's least gecko (Sphaerodactylus copei) is a species of lizard in the family Sphaerodactylidae. The species is endemic to the West Indies.

Etymology
The specific name, copei, is in honor of American herpetologist and paleontologist Edward Drinker Cope.

Geographic range
S. copei is found in Haiti and the Bahamas. Whether the Bahamian populations result from introductions or natural dispersal is debated.

Habitat

Reproduction
S. copei is oviparous.

Subspecies
Nine subspecies are recognized as being valid, including the nominotypical subspecies
Sphaerodactylus copei astreptus 
Sphaerodactylus copei cataplexis 
Sphaerodactylus copei copei 
Sphaerodactylus copei deuterus 
Sphaerodactylus copei enochrus 
Sphaerodactylus copei pelates 
Sphaerodactylus copei picturatus 
Sphaerodactylus copei polyommatus 
Sphaerodactylus copei websteri

References

Further reading
Barbour T (1921). "Sphaerodactylus ". Memoirs of the Museum of Comparative Zoology at Harvard College 47 (3): 215-282. (Sphaerodactylus copei, pp. 259–260 + Plate 7, figure 2; Plate 21, figures 5-8).
Garman S (1887). "On West Indian Geckonidæ and Anguidæ". Bulletin of the Essex Institute 19: 17-24. (Sphærodactylus picturatus, new species, pp. 19–20).
Rösler H (2000). "Kommentierte Liste der rezent, subrezent und fossil bekannten Geckotaxa (Reptilia: Gekkonomorpha) ". Gekkota 2: 28-153. (Sphaerodactylus copei, p. 111). (in German).
Schwartz A (1975). "New Subspecies of Sphaerodactylus copei Steindachner (Sauria, Gekkonidae) from Hispaniola". Herpetologica 31 (1): 1-18. (Sphaerodactylus copei astreptus, new subspecies; S. c. deuterus, new subspecies; S. c. pelates, new subspecies; S. c. websteri, new subspecies). 
Schwartz A, Henderson RW (1991). Amphibians and Reptiles of the West Indies: Descriptions, Distributions, and Natural History. Gainesville, Florida: University of Florida Press. 720 pp. . (Sphaerodactylus copei, p. 480).
Schwartz A, Thomas R (1965). "Subspeciation in Sphaerodactylus copei ". Quarterly Journal of the Florida Academy of Sciences 27 (4): 316-332. (Sphaerodactylus copei cataplexis, new subspecies, pp. 326–330; S. c. enochrus, new subspecies, pp. 322–324).
Schwartz A, Thomas R (1975). A Check-list of West Indian Amphibians and Reptiles. Carnegie Museum of Natural History Special Publication No. 1. Pittsburgh, Pennsylvania: Carnegie Museum of Natural History. 216 pp. (Sphaerodactylus copei, pp. 146–148).
Steindachner F (1867). "Reptilien ". pp. 1–98. In: von Scherzer K (1867). Reise der Österreichischen Fregatte Novara um die Erde in den Jahren 1857, 1858, 1859 [unter den Befehlen des Kommodore] B. von Wüllerstorf-Urbair. Zoologischer Theil. Erster Band. (Wirbelthiere). Vienna: Kaiserlich-Könlichen Hof- und Staatsdruckerei/ Karl Gerold's Sohn. (Sphaerodactylus copei, new species, pp. 18-19). (in German).
Thomas R (1968). "Notes on Antillean Geckos (Sphaerodactylus)". Herpetologica 24 (1): 46-60. (Sphaerodactylus copei polyommatus, new subspecies).

Sphaerodactylus
Reptiles of the Bahamas
Reptiles of Haiti
Reptiles described in 1867
Taxa named by Franz Steindachner